Hakeem Rizwan Hafeez Malik  (born 22 September 1956) is a Pakistani medical researcher, former President of National Council for Tibb and former Administrator/Authority of National Council for Tibb, Ministry of Health Government of Pakistan.

Career
Hakeem Rizwan Hafeez Malik is a practitioner of Tibb-e-Unani in Pakistan.

He has treated liver, stomach, asthma, gout arthritis, gynecological complications, pollen allergy and obesity.  To promote general well-being and public awareness on health issues, he has been regularly appearing on Pakistan's ATV channel for last 7 years, advising people on health issues. He was the driving force behind implementation of a standard 5-year curriculum for bachelor's degree in Colleges of Tibb on the lines of MBBS curriculum medical degree. He conceived a plan for establishment of Tibb Complex, Research Center and a Botanical Garden for promotion of research in Tibb-e-Unani. 

In 2018, a two-day symposium was arranged by the Faculty of Eastern Medicine, Hamdard University, Karachi, where Hakeem Rizwan Hafeez Malik was the chief guest, many physicians of Unani medicine shared their views and knowledge in Unani medicine with others.

Awards and recognition 

Sitara-i-Imtiaz (Star of Distinction) by the President of Pakistan in 2013. 

Tamgha-i-Imtiaz (Medal of Distinction) by the Government of Pakistan in 2007.

References

External links
Hakeem Rizwan Hafeez Malik interview on Pakistani TV on YouTube

1956 births
Living people
Recipients of Sitara-i-Imtiaz
Recipients of Tamgha-e-Imtiaz
Unani practitioners
South Asian traditional medicine
Pakistani homeopaths
Pakistani humanitarians
Pakistani medical researchers
Pakistani medical writers